The 2023 Ball State Cardinals football team will represent Ball State University during the 2023 NCAA Division I FBS football season. The Cardinals are led by eighth-year head coach Mike Neu and play their home games at Scheumann Stadium in Muncie, Indiana. They compete as members of the West Division of the Mid-American Conference.

Previous season

The Cardinals finished the 2022 season 5–7 and 3–5 in the MAC to finish tied for fourth place in the West Division.

Schedule

References

Ball State
Ball State Cardinals football seasons
Ball State Cardinals football